Tropidophoxinellus hellenicus is a species of ray-finned fish in the family Cyprinidae.

It is found only in Greece. Its natural habitats are rivers and freshwater lakes.

References

Tropidophoxinellus
Fish described in 1971
Cyprinid fish of Europe
Taxonomy articles created by Polbot
Taxa named by Alexander I. Stephanidis